Monastiri (meaning "monastery", before 1928: Μποτσιφάρι - Botsifari) is a settlement in the Ioannina regional unit in Epirus, Greece. It is situated on the northwestern slopes of Smolikas, at the elevation of 950m. Below the village is the river Sarantaporos, which empties into the Aoos a few kilometers west before entering Albania. It is in the municipality of Konitsa. In 2011 its population was 17. It is 1 km southwest of Molista, 10 km northeast of Konitsa and 18 km east of Leskovik (Albania).

Population

See also

List of settlements in the Ioannina regional unit

External links
Monastiri at the GTP Travel Pages

References

Populated places in Ioannina (regional unit)

ro:Molista